George K. Michalopoulos is a Greek-American pathologist, currently the Chair of the Department of Pathology, Maud L. Menten Professor of Pathology and a Distinguished Professor at the University of Pittsburgh.

Education

He earned an M.D. at the University of Athens (1969) and a Ph.D. in Oncology at the University of Wisconsin School of Medicine and Public Health (1977).

References

External links

Year of birth missing (living people)
Living people
University of Pittsburgh faculty
American pathologists
Greek pathologists

National and Kapodistrian University of Athens alumni
University of Wisconsin School of Medicine and Public Health alumni
Greek emigrants to the United States
American medical academics
American medical researchers